Sir Themistocles "Temi" Zammit  (or Żammit; 30 September 1864 – 2 November 1935) was a Maltese archaeologist and historian, professor of chemistry, medical doctor, researcher and writer. He served as Rector (1920–26) of the Royal University of Malta and first Director of the National Museum of Archaeology in his native city, Valletta.

Career

After graduating in medicine from the University of Malta, Zammit specialised in bacteriology in London and Paris. It's understood that in 1905 the discovery of contaminated milk as the vector for transmission to humans of Brucellosis melitensis present in the blood of the goat greatly contributed to the elimination from the islands of undulant fever, earning him the knighthood. However, it was Giuseppe Caruana Scicluna (1853-1921), the first Maltese  analyst and bacteriologist trained at the world renowned Pasteur Institute in Paris who carried out most, if not all, of the bacteriological work.

Author of several literary works in the Maltese language, Zammit was conferred the DLitt Honoris Causa by Oxford University. He was knighted in 1930, having previously been admitted as a Companion to the Order of St Michael and St George. He also published a history of the Maltese islands and excavated important archaeological sites, such as the Hypogeum and the megalithic Tarxien Temples, Ħaġar Qim and Mnajdra, which have since been declared UNESCO World Heritage Sites.

Legacy

Zammit's scientific approach to archaeology further enhanced his international reputation. A permanent display of some of his findings may be viewed at the National Museum of Archaeology in Valletta.

The main hall of the University of Malta bears Zammit's name. The Sir Temi Zammit Hall is a multipurpose auditorium which is used as a lecture hall, theatre, and student graduations venue.

Zammit is depicted on two commemorative Maltese coins: a Maltese 1 Pound (Lm1) coin dated 1973 and a Maltese 5 Pounds (Lm5) coin dated 2006. Both coins are silver and depict his likeness alongside his dates of birth and death.

Zammit signed most of his works with his initials T. Z.

Further reading

Sir Themistocles (Temi) Zammit

 Roger Ellul-Micallef, Zammit of Malta. His Times, Life and Achievements, 2 volumes, Valletta: Allied Publications, 2013.

References

1864 births
1935 deaths
Maltese archaeologists
Knights Bachelor
Companions of the Order of St Michael and St George
Maltese historians
Maltese physicians
Maltese knights
People from Valletta
Academic staff of the University of Malta
19th-century archaeologists
19th-century historians
20th-century archaeologists
20th-century historians
Maltese curators
University of Malta alumni
English-language writers from Malta